The Statfold Barn Railway is a narrow gauge railway based near Tamworth, Staffordshire and partially in Warwickshire, England. Founded by engineering entrepreneur Graham Lee and his wife Carol at their farm-based home, they originally designed what is still termed the garden railway, in which Graham could run his trains and Carol could design an extensive English country garden around a lake.

Graham Lee chaired the family-owned LH Group, with its main focus on railway engineering services. After LH Group acquired what remained of the Hunslet Engine Company in 2005, Graham pursued the opportunity to acquire the last steam locomotive built by Hunslet. Commissioned in 1971, it had been ordered by Leeds-based Robert Hudson & Co Ltd, who supplied and installed a complete railway system for the Trangkil sugar mill estate in Indonesia. As he pursued the Hunslet, Graham noticed a number of other interesting but defunct steam locomotives of European origin in Indonesia, and set about recovering these as well.

After Wabtec acquired LH Group in 2012, Graham retained the rights to produce steam locomotives under the Hunslet name. He had produced the first new steam powered Hunslet in 2006, and also restored several locomotives in the collection. In 2017, Graham and Carol Lee gave the collection of over 100 locomotives and associated vehicles, equipment and ephemera to the newly formed Statfold Narrow Gauge Museum Trust, to ensure the collection was retained and maintained at its current site.

Today the railway has an extensive workshop where locomotives are built and restored. The railway is not open to the public, but a number of "Enthusiasts' Days" are held each year and interested enthusiasts may apply for an invitation to one of these events.

History 
Having acquired Statfold Farm near Tamworth, Staffordshire as their family home, engineer Graham Lee – who had worked his way up through family owned LH Group, and eventually became chairman – persuaded his wife Carol to build a  narrow gauge railway around their garden and lake.

Happy with the garden railway, it was not until LH Group acquired what remained of the Hunslet Engine Company in 2005, that Graham pursued the opportunity to acquire the last steam locomotive built by Hunslet (and the last steam locomotive to be built in the UK for industrial use). Commissioned in 1971 to an original Kerr Stuart design, it had been ordered by Leeds-based Robert Hudson & Co, who supplied and installed a complete railway system for the Trangkil sugar mill estate in Indonesia. Negotiations were conducted via Hunslet's agent in Jakarta, and after visiting the site during negotiations and to supervise the loading of Trangkil No.4, Graham noticed a number of other interesting but defunct steam locomotives of European origin in Indonesia, and set about recovering these as well. Pakis Baru and Sragi sugar mills had interesting locomotive fleets and two examples from German manufacturers were acquired from each.

As Indonesia's state environmental laws do not allow the export of scrap-metal, Trangkil No.4 together with five other locomotives Graham proposed to export back to the UK had to be shown in steam and moving. Whilst Trangkil No.4 was still 2 ft gauge, the other five locomotives were built to the more common European 2 ft 6inches gauge. Graham hence built with friends what is now term the mainline – in dual 2 ft and  gauge – which runs around the outside in a basic oval shape of the original garden railway. Thus was formed the Statfold Barn Railway, and its core collection.

After Wabtec acquired LH Group in 2012, Graham retained the rights to produce steam locomotives under the Hunslet name. He had produced the first new steam powered Hunslet in 2006, and used the same facilities to restore items in the collection. In March 2010 some 51 locomotives were based on the Statfold Barn Railway, either operable or waiting for restoration or rebuild.

In 2017, Graham and Carol Lee gave the collection of over 100 locomotives and associated vehicles, equipment and ephemera to the newly formed Statfold Narrow Gauge Trust, to ensure the collection was retained and maintained at its current site.

Today the railway has its own workshop where locomotives are restored and maintained. There is a passing loop halfway along the line which has a single platform 'Oak Tree Halt' and a siding heading off to storage facilities in the 'Grain Store' roundhouse. There is also a separate (but connected) loop line 'Garden Railway' of  gauge round an ornamental lake.

For the 2017 season, a narrow gauge tram track was laid in concrete parallel to the level section of the Field Railway incorporating an  mixed gauge rail line.  The running shed had a triple gauge line leading down into the standard gauge storage sidings and then across the Field Railway where a short stub led into a field.

Statfold Engineering Ltd is a separate company operating on the same site operated by Graham Lee's grandson, Nick Noon. Established in 2017, it undertakes work for outside customers, mainly in the railway industry.

Rolling stock

Steam locomotives

Diesel locomotives

Petrol locomotives

Compressed air locomotives

Electric locomotives

Railcars

Trams

Unpowered passenger stock
In May 2014 the railway obtained a rake of four passenger coaches, originally built in 1984 for the Thorpe Park theme park, and latterly used on the Lynton and Barnstaple Railway. In 2019 it was donated a coach which originated with the Ramsgate Tunnel Railway of 1936.

References

External links

 Official website
 Report and photos of a visit to the railway
 Videos of the railway on 2 June 2007 from YouTube: part 1 part 2

Heritage railways in Staffordshire
Heritage railways in Warwickshire
2 ft gauge railways in England
2 ft 6 in gauge railways in England
3 ft 6 in gauge railways in England
Narrow-gauge railway museums in the United Kingdom